The Portal Ranger Station, also known as Portal Work Station, is located in Cave Creek Canyon, in the eastern Chiricahua Mountains, in Coronado National Forest near Portal, southeastern Arizona.

The office building and the pumphouse building of the complex were built in 1934 by the Civilian Conservation Corps. The office was designed by architects of the United States Forest Service in a Craftsman Bungalow style.

The station was listed on the National Register of Historic Places in 1993 for its Bungalow/Craftsman architecture. The NRHP listing was for three contributing buildings on a  property.

It was deemed significant "for its association with expansion of Forest Service administration from custodial superintendence to active resource management."

See also
 National Register of Historic Places listings in Cochise County, Arizona

References

Coronado National Forest
United States Forest Service ranger stations
Buildings and structures in Cochise County, Arizona
Government buildings completed in 1934
Park buildings and structures on the National Register of Historic Places in Arizona
1934 establishments in Arizona
Civilian Conservation Corps in Arizona
Bungalow architecture in Arizona
American Craftsman architecture in Arizona
National Register of Historic Places in Cochise County, Arizona